Van Deusen's rat (Rattus vandeuseni) is a species of rodent in the family Muridae.
It is endemic to the mountains of southeast Papua New Guinea.

References

Rattus
Rodents of New Guinea
Endemic fauna of Papua New Guinea
Rodents of Papua New Guinea
Endangered fauna of Oceania
Mammals described in 1983
Taxonomy articles created by Polbot
Taxa named by Edward Harrison Taylor